El rey de los taxistas (English: "The King of the Taxi Drivers") is a 1989 Mexican comedy film directed by Benito Alazraki and starring Luis de Alba and Maribel Guardia.

Plot
Taxi driver Juan Camaney (de Alba) is married to the beautiful Lorena (Guardia), but he gets involved in multiple affairs. Lorena, upset, agrees to work as a model for a photographer. Juan is accused for crimes that are actually committed by two men who take his taxi when he is not working. His wife and two friends Juan him clear his name, but when she sees that he is still a womanizer, Lorena marries the photographer and travels to the United States. Juan only asks her to send him two VCRs and a television.

Cast
Luis de Alba as Juan Camaney
Maribel Guardia as Lorena
Pedro Weber as Deputy Pérez García (as Pedro Weber "Chatanuga")
Ana Berumen as Dionisia
Roberto Miranda (as Puck Miranda) 		
Carlos Yustis
Armando Ramírez
Gonzalo Sánchez
Charly Valentino as Jaime
César Bono as Devil
Jorge Zamora as Zamorita (como Zamorita)
Gloria Alicia Inclán
Olimpia Alazraki
Beatriz Arroyo
Laura Tovar
Ana Luz Aldana
Eduardo Lugo
Adrian Gómez
Moris Grey
Roberto Ruy
Adriana Rojas
Miguel Manzano
Aida Pierce
Silvia Suárez

Production and release
The film was shot in 1987. It was released on 2 February 1989 on the Insurgentes 70, Tlatelolco, Las Alamedas 1, Premier, Emiliano Zapata, Lago 2, Marina, Tlalnepantla, Nacional, Vicente Guerrero, Tlalpan, Santos Degollado and Brasil cinemas, for four weeks.

References

External links

1989 films
1989 comedy films
1980s Spanish-language films
Films directed by Benito Alazraki
Mexican comedy films
1980s Mexican films